Tenodera angustipennis is a species of mantis native to Asia and nearby areas of Oceania. The species was introduced and became established in the eastern United States.  Tenodera angustipennis was noticed as early as 1921 in Aberdeen, Maryland, but that occurrence was not noted in a published record until 1933.

Etymology
This species has two common names narrow-winged mantis and Japanese mantis in English. This insect is known as チョウセンカマキリ (translates to "Korean mantis") in the Japanese language and 참사마귀, (an alternative name which translates to "true mantis") as well as just plain 사마귀 (a formal name) in the Korean language (사마귀 can mean the whole order of Mantodea or this specific species of praying mantis).

"Tenodera" is from Greek meaning "slender neck" and "angustipennis" is from Latin meaning "narrow wing".

Description

Adults and nymphs
Size: Males 65~80 mm, females 68~85 mm in length.  Tenodera angustipennis are often brown or green.  Tenodera angustipennis proportionately have a more elongate pronotum and shorter, narrower tegmina and wings than Tenodera sinensis.  T. angustipennis have a brown, patterned streak on each of their transparent hind wings, while T. sinensis have hind wings that are completely patterned and brown.
  The Chinese mantis is thicker or more stocky than the narrow-winged mantis.  It can be easy for a person to tell apart between the adults of these two species, Tenodera angustipennis and Tenodera sinensis, when the two species are placed side by side.

Ootheca
The oothecae of Tenodera angustipennis are elongate, about 40 to 60 millimeters long and about 14 millimeters in diameter and are sometimes mistaken to be Stagmomantis carolina oothecae.  T. angustipennis oothecae probably hatch around 1 to 2 weeks later than T. sinensis do.

Range
This species occurs in China, Hawaii, India, Java, Korean Peninsula, Ulleung-do, Jejudo, Taiwan, Vietnam, Honshu, Shikoku, Kyushu, Tsushima Island, Okinawa Island. 
Non-native range in the United States:
Delaware, Maryland,New York, North Carolina, New Jersey, Ohio, Pennsylvania,Virginia.

Habitat
The oothecae are often laid on twigs of shrubs, stems of tall herbs, but in field margins they seem to prefer to lay their oothecae on tree trunks and fence posts. In some areas T. angustipennis is just as common as T. sinensis.

Additional images

See also
Chinese mantis
List of mantis genera and species

References

Bibliography
 

Mantidae
Mantodea of Asia
Mantodea of Oceania
Insects of China
Insects of India
Insects of Indonesia
Insects of Japan
Insects of Korea
Insects of Malaysia
Insects of the Philippines
Insects of Taiwan
Insects of Vietnam
Mantodea of North America
Insects described in 1869